Aboriginal Air Services was an umbrella company of 4 distinct airlines owned by the Aboriginal people of central Australia. Four companies (see list below) gradually came together as a consortium over nearly twenty years. The consortium, known as Aboriginal Air Services was fully owned by the Aboriginal people.

In the late 1990s, Aboriginal Air Services offered tourist flights on the mail plane.

The consortium ceased operating on 17 September 2006.

Airlines
 Ngaanyatjarra Air (Western Australia)
 Ngurratjuta Air (Northern Territory, operated by the Ngurajuta Association of Hermannsburg)
 Janami Air (Northern Territory, from the Warlpiri tribe)
 PY Air (South Australia)

Fleet
 Cessna 208 Caravan
 Cessna 210
 Cessna Grand Caravan
 Embraer EMB 110 Bandeirante

See also
 List of defunct airlines of Australia
 Aviation in Australia

References

Defunct airlines of Australia